The Howrah–Katihar Weekly Express is an Express train belonging to Northeast Frontier Railway zone that runs between  and  in India. It is currently being operated with 15711/15712 train numbers on a four days in a week basis.

Service

The 15711/Howrah–Katihar Weekly Express has an average speed of 48 km/hr and covers 424 km in 8h 50m. The 15712/Katihar–Howrah Weekly Express has an average speed of 48 km/hr and covers 424 km in 8h 50m.

Route and halts 

The important halts of the train are:

Coach composition

The train has standard ICF rakes with a max speed of 110 kmph. The train consists of 16 coaches:

 1 AC II Tier
 2 AC III Tier
 5 Sleeper coaches
 6 General Unreserved
 2 Seating cum Luggage Rake

Traction

Both trains are hauled by a Malda Town Loco Shed-based WDM-3A diesel locomotive from Howrah to Katihar, and vice versa.

See also 

 Howrah Junction railway station
 Katihar Junction railway station

Notes

References

External links 

 15711/Howrah–Katihar Weekly Express India Rail Info
 15712/Katihar–Howrah Weekly Express India Rail Info

Rail transport in Howrah
Transport in Katihar
Express trains in India
Rail transport in West Bengal
Rail transport in Bihar
Railway services introduced in 2014